is a former Japanese football player. His elder brother Mitsuhiro Toda is also a former footballer.

Playing career
Toda was born in Miyakonojo on December 8, 1979. After graduating from University of Teacher Education Fukuoka, he joined J2 League club Shonan Bellmare in 2002. He played many matches as forward from first season. However his opportunity to play decreased in 2004. He was converted to center back and played many matches in 2005. However he could not play many matches in 2006. In 2007, he moved to Japan Football League club Gainare Tottori. He played many matches as center back in 2 seasons. He retired end of 2008 season.

Club statistics

References

External links

1979 births
Living people
University of Teacher Education Fukuoka alumni
Association football people from Miyazaki Prefecture
Japanese footballers
J2 League players
Japan Football League players
Shonan Bellmare players
Gainare Tottori players
Association football defenders